Blake Pier may refer to the following.

Blake Pier, Central: a demolished ferry pier in Central, Hong Kong.
Blake Pier at Stanley: an existing ferry pier in Stanley, Hong Kong.

zh:卜公碼頭